Blue Black may refer to:
 Blue Black (album), a 1975 album by jazz pianist Andrew Hill
 Blue Black, member of the Unspoken Heard hip-hop collaboration
 "Blue Black", a song by Heather Nova from her 1994 album Oyster